Denisa Ștefania Șandru (née  Dedu; born 27 September 1994) is a Romanian handballer for Rapid București and the Romanian national team.

International honours 
EHF Cup:
Winner: 2019Third place: 2016
World University Championship:Silver Medalist'': 2016

Individual awards
 Liga Națională Best Romanian Player: 2019
Carpathian Trophy Best Goalkeeper: 2016

References

External links

 

1994 births
Living people
Romanian female handball players
Sportspeople from Brașov
Siófok KC players
Expatriate handball players
Romanian expatriate sportspeople in Hungary